Harold Charles "Hal" Thompson (October 18, 1922 – April 26, 2006) was an American football end and defensive end who played for two seasons in the National Football League (NFL). He played for the Brooklyn Dodgers from 1948 to 1949 after playing college football for the Delaware Fightin' Blue Hens.

1922 births
2006 deaths
Manasquan High School alumni
People from Manasquan, New Jersey
Players of American football from New Jersey
American football defensive ends
Delaware Fightin' Blue Hens football players
Brooklyn Dodgers (NFL) players
Sportspeople from Monmouth County, New Jersey
Wilmington Clippers players